Vaccarezza is a surname. Notable people with the surname include:

 Alberto Vaccarezza (1886–1959), Argentine poet and playwright
 Angelo Vaccarezza (born 1965), Italian politician

See also
 Vacarezza

Italian-language surnames